Cobbanites is a genus of extinct ammonoid cephalopods from the Family Perisphinctidae. Species of the genus date from the Jurassic (Bathonian to Early Callovian) period and have been found in the US (Alaska and Montana).

Species 
Cobbanites can be split into two species as follows:

 Cobbanites engleri
 Cobbanites talkeetnanus

References 

Ammonites of North America
Jurassic ammonites
Early Jurassic first appearances
Middle Jurassic extinctions